Agudo is a municipality in Ciudad Real, Castile-La Mancha, Spain. It has a population of 2,013.

Municipalities in the Province of Ciudad Real